Reidar Andersen (20 April 1911 – 15 December 1991) was a Norwegian ski jumper who competed in the 1930s.

Career
He won a ski jumping bronze at the 1936 Winter Olympics in Garmisch-Partenkirchen. In addition, he won ski jumping silver medals at the 1930, 1935, and 1937 FIS Nordic World Ski Championships.

On 14 and 15 March 1935 he set a total of three world records (93,  and 99 metres) on Bloudkova velikanka hill in Planica, Kingdom of Yugoslavia.

Andersen won the Holmenkollen ski festival's men's ski jumping competition in 1936, 1937, and 1938, the only person to ever win this event three straight years.

In 1938, Andersen shared the Holmenkollen medal with fellow Norwegian Johan R. Henriksen.

Ski jumping world records

References

External links

Holmenkollen medalists – click Holmenkollmedaljen for downloadable pdf file 
Holmenkollen winners since 1892 – click Vinnere for downloadable pdf file 

Ski jumpers at the 1936 Winter Olympics
Holmenkollen medalists
Holmenkollen Ski Festival winners
Olympic ski jumpers of Norway
Olympic bronze medalists for Norway
1911 births
1991 deaths
Olympic medalists in ski jumping
FIS Nordic World Ski Championships medalists in ski jumping
Medalists at the 1936 Winter Olympics
People from Ringerike (municipality)
Sportspeople from Viken (county)